Anna Maria – Eine Frau geht ihren Weg (Anna Maria – A Woman Follows Her Path) was a German drama television series broadcast between 1994 and 1997 on Sat.1 in 29 episodes. Uschi Glas provided a summary by the series, and claimed to have written the screenplay. The series revolved around Uschi Glas, playing an energetic widow of a gravel pit owner Hannes Seeberger (Michael Degen) who is forced to bring up her children Patricia and Manuel alone and face bankruptcy with her husband's company.

See also
List of German television series

External links
 

German drama television series
1994 German television series debuts
1997 German television series endings
German-language television shows
Sat.1 original programming